Tolbaños de Abajo is a village in the municipality of Valle de Valdelaguna located southeast of the province of Burgos, Castilla y León (Spain).

In Tolbaños de Abajo may be one of the better preserved meadows of the Iberian Peninsula, with specimens of oak (Quercus pyrenaica) and sessile oak (Quercus petraea), the latter are close to 400 years of age. There are also beautiful examples of holly.

References
1.↑ Enrique del Rivero. Rincones singulares de Burgos. VI El sur de la Sierra de la Demanda. Caja de Burgos, 200, Dep. Legal Bu-445, p. 32

2.↑ Boletín Oficial de la Provincia de Burgos, número 79 de 25 de abril de 2007[1]

3.↑ Uno de de los catorce partidos que formaban la Intendencia de Burgos durante el periodo comprendido entre 1785 y 1833, tal como se recoge en el Censo de Floridablanca de 1787

Towns in Spain